Frances Marjorie Graves (17 September 1884 – 17 November 1961) was a British civil servant, Conservative politician and writer.

Early life 
She was born in Allerton, Liverpool, and was the youngest daughter of William Graves and his wife Fanny Charlotte née Neilson. William Graves was a ship owner in the port whose father had been Conservative MP for Liverpool. The Graves family subsequently moved to Newells, Horsham, Sussex, where William became a Justice of the Peace. They also maintained a house in Brompton Square, London.

Education 
Marjorie had a private education, later schooling being carried out at Château de Dieudonne, Bornel, France. Her researches in the Bibliothèque Nationale and Archives Nationales in Paris led to her publications of three works.

Career

Civil service 
With the outbreak of war in 1914 she took up employment in the Foreign Office. She attended the post-World War I Paris Peace Conference, before transferring to the Intelligence Department of the Home Office.

Political career 
Graves was politically a Conservative, and was a member of Holborn Borough Council from 1928 to 1934. She became the first female chairman of the Metropolitan Area of the National Union of Conservative and Unionist Associations in 1936.

In 1931 she was chosen as Conservative candidate for the parliamentary constituency of Hackney South, held by Labour cabinet minister Herbert Morrison. She succeeded in unseating Morrison to become the area's Member of Parliament. At the next general election in 1935 she was hopeful of retaining the seat, with her campaign centering on opposition to the use of Hackney Marshes for the building of council houses. She was, however, badly beaten, with Morrison returning to parliament with a large majority.

In 1936 she formed part of the British Government delegation to the League of Nations. In 1937 she was adopted as prospective candidate for Barnstaple, Devon. The next general election was, however,  delayed until 1945 by the Second World War, and she did not contest the seat.

Retirement 
She retired to Wareham, Dorset, where she became a member of the county council. She was unmarried, and died in Wareham in November 1961.

Interests 
In 1932 and 1933 she was a vice-president of the Supporters Club of the Clapton Orient Football Club and worked closely with Herbert Morrison MP in support of Clapton Orient. Source: Neilson N. Kaufman, honorary historian Leyton Orient FC.

Works 
 Catalogue of the Loan Exhibition of relics of past and present wars, held at South Lodge, Horsham, August 7, 1916. By F. M. Graves. [With plates.] pp. ix. 62. G. P. Putnam's Sons: London & New York, 1917. 4º.
 Graves, Frances Marjorie. Quelques pièces relatives à la vie de Louis I., duc d’Orléans et de Valentine Visconti, sa femme. pp. xii. 310. 1913. Bibliothèque. Bibliothèque du XVe siècle. tom. 19. 1906, etc. 8º.
 Campan, Jeanne Louise Henriette. Mémoires sur la vie privée de Marie-Antoinette, reine de France. Memoirs of the Private Life of Marie Antoinette ... Third edition. Memoirs of the Private Life of Marie Antoinette, to which are added personal recollections illustrative of the reigns of Louis XIV, XV, XVI ... Also a memoir of Madame Campan by F. Barrière. A new edition, revised by F. M. Graves. With an introduction and notes by J. Holland Rose ... Illustrated with thirty plates [including portraits]. 3 vol. H. Young & Sons: Liverpool, 1917 [1916].

References

Further reading 
 United Kingdom Parliament. Women in the House of Commons House of Commons Information Office, Factsheet M4, Appendix B - Women MPs by date of first election

External links 
 

Conservative Party (UK) MPs for English constituencies
Hackney Members of Parliament
English non-fiction writers
1884 births
1961 deaths
UK MPs 1931–1935
Female members of the Parliament of the United Kingdom for English constituencies
Members of Holborn Metropolitan Borough Council
20th-century British women politicians
20th-century English women
20th-century English people
Women councillors in England